The 1923–24 İstanbul Football League season was the 17th season of the league. Beşiktaş JK won the league for the first time. The tournament was single-elimination, not league as in the past.

Season

Semifinals

Final

Participated teams
Fenerbahçe SK, Altınordu İdman Yurdu SK, Galatasaray SK, Vefa SK, Hilal SK, Küçükçekmece SK, Beşiktaş JK, Beylerbeyi SK, Üsküdar Anadolu SK, Nişantaşı SK, Topkapı İdman Yurdu SK, Darüşşafaka SK, İstiklal SK, Gürbüzler, Makrıköyspor, Kumkapı SK, Üsküdar, Türk İdman Ocağı SK, Fatih SK, Yenişafak SK, Kasımpaşa SK, Topkapı SK, Haliç, Fazilet

References
 Durupınar, Mehmet (2002). Beşiktaş Tarihi. Yapı Kredi Yayınları 
 Dağlaroğlu, Rüştü. Fenerbahçe Spor Kulübü Tarihi 1907-1957

Istanbul Football League seasons
Turkey
Istanbul